The 1997 Sunbelt IndyCarnival was the second round of the 1997 CART World Series Season, held on 6 April 1997 on the Surfers Paradise Street Circuit, Surfers Paradise, Queensland, Australia. Scott Pruett won his 2nd and final victory of his career as a driver in CART.

Qualifying results

Race 

Christian Fittipaldi started the race but broke his leg in a massive crash on Lap 2. Because the race was restarted, the first start was considered void and thus Fittipaldi was not classified starting the race.

Notes 

 Average Speed 85.328 mph

External links
 Full Weekend Times & Results

Sunbelt Indy Carnival
Sunbelt Indy Carnival
Gold Coast Indy 300